Seodaemun Museum of Natural History is a first public museum of natural history in South Korea, located in a metropolitan area, Seodaemun-gu, Seoul. It was founded in 2003 and operated by Seodaemun-gu Administration. The purpose of the foundation is to preserve, to study, and to exhibit geological and biological records about the local environment.

Popular culture 
Seodaemun Museum of Natural History was used as the main filming location in episode 84 of the South Korean variety show Running Man filmed in 2012.

See also
List of museums in Seoul

References

External links
 Museum of Natural History
 Seodaemun Museum of Natural History on Google Cultural Institute

Seodaemun District
Museums in Seoul
Natural history museums in South Korea